Christina Lewis Halpern is an American social entrepreneur and journalist. She has founded two organizations: All Star Code, a non-profit education organization that attracts, prepares, and places young men of color in the branch of technology, and Give Blck, a comprehensive database of Black-founded non-profit organizations.

Life and career 
Lewis was born around 1980. She grew up in New York City with her parents and sister. Her father, Reginald F. Lewis, was a pioneer on Wall Street and the first African American to own a billion-dollar company in the US. Her mother, Loida Nicolas Lewis, is a Filipino-born American businesswoman who served as Chair and CEO of TLC Beatrice after her husband died.

Lewis attended Harvard University where she graduated in 2002 with a BA in history and literature. After graduating from college, Lewis worked as a journalist for Court TV for a year, then the Stamford Advocate for a year, then worked for the Wall Street Journal writing about real estate from 2005 to 2010.  After that, she started working as a freelance journalist and writer.

In 2012, she published a memoir and biography of her father, Lonely at the Top, which explored her life and achievements in parallel to her father's.

In 2013, she founded All Star Code, a nonprofit that teaches Black and Latino young men computer skills and soft skills over intensive summer sessions. She initially funded it with money from the Lewis family office. The program has also made use of corporate partnerships; the fall 2013 launch was hosted at the offices of Spotify in New York City, Google has worked with the program, and the 2016 summer program was sponsored by Goldman Sachs.

In 2014, Lewis was recognized by the Obama administration as a "Champion of Change for STEM Access," and in 2016, the National Action Network honored Lewis as a “Woman of Power” for her work in the program.

As of 2018, All Star Code’s summer program had graduated 290 students.

Outside of All Star Code, Lewis has been an angel investor and has served on Hunter College’s computer science advisory board.

Personal life 
Lewis married Daniel Halpern in 2010.

References 

1980 births
Living people
African-American journalists
American people of Filipino descent
American women business executives
American women chief executives
Women of African descent
Harvard University alumni
21st-century African-American people
21st-century African-American women
20th-century African-American people
20th-century African-American women